Nishabdham is a 2020 Indian Telugu-language mystery film directed by Hemant Madhukar and co-produced by Kona Venkat and T. G. Vishwa Prasad. The film stars R. Madhavan, Michael Madsen, Anushka Shetty, Anjali, Shalini Pandey and Subbaraju.  Although the film was intended to have no dialogues, it was later shot in Telugu and partially reshot in Tamil, with the latter version titled Silence. The film is released along with the dubbed versions in Malayalam and Kannada languages, through Amazon Prime Video on 2 October 2020.

Plot 

In 1972, a couple spending Christmas night at a villa near Seattle is mysteriously murdered, with the male victim being crucified. The King County takes possession of the villa, which remains unsold until 2019 due to its reputation as a haunted house.

Sakshi, a deaf-mute artist, travels with her fiancé to the villa to find a painting of a previous owner whose ghost is believed to have killed the couple. However, she runs away blood-stained after a while and gets hit by a car. Detective Mahalakshmi and Captain Richard Dawkins are assigned to investigate. It is revealed that Sakshi's fiancé has died in the basement, and as his corpse is taken out, a key falls from his hand. Maha interrogates Sakshi in the hospital, learning that she found his body crucified and could not see the attacker. Maha then researches the victim, Anthony Gonsalves, a famous cellist whose previous wife committed suicide.

As many girls have already gone missing in Seattle, the police are under heavy scrutiny. The initial investigation is inconclusive, so Sakshi is interviewed again. It is revealed that soon after her engagement with Anthony, Sakshi's best friend Sonali went missing. Sakshi recounts her past. She grew up in an orphanage in Sequim where she met Sonali. One day, she received an invitation to show her art in a Seattle gallery. Sonali, who is very possessive, does not agree but changes her mind after deciding to live with Sakshi. At the gallery, Sakshi meets Vivek, a photographer. Anthony, a new exhibition's guest of honor, meets Sakshi and is impressed with her work. He donates a million dollars to her orphanage and invites her to his concert. Sakshi attends and is mesmerized by his music. They grow closer and eventually fall in love and get engaged. After Sonali went missing, she decided to go to the villa for a week to relax and find the painting.

Maha realises that Sonali wants all of Sakshi's attention after seeing similar behavior in a child. She goes to the orphanage to investigate Sonali's disappearance, suspecting a connection to Anthony's death. She learns that Sonali's only friend was Sakshi, even getting arrested for stabbing someone who went out with her. Maha also discovers a drawing of a crucifixion in Sonali's room. Concerned, Maha goes to Sakshi's house and encounters a hooded man who escapes after she shoots at him. The police searches the villa again, hoping to discover evidence against Sonali. Tom finds the key in the basement brings it to Richard, who kills Tom and pockets it. Maha notices Richard's coat button next to Tom's corpse and suspects his involvement, so she breaks into his office and gets the key. She then trails Richard and follows him to a farmhouse, which she discovers secretly belongs to Anthony. Richard searches for the house's CCTV footage to no avail and leaves. Soon afterwards, the hooded man, revealed to be Vivek, who took the footage earlier, meets with Sakshi at the Space Needle, where a flashback occurs.

Vivek and Sakshi became good friends and started living together with Sonali, who becomes jealous. Vivek is hurt, but Sakshi explains Sonali's nature. When Sonali and Sakshi were baristas, a customer asked Sakshi out. Sonali insists that he is a flirt and tried to prove it. Sonali and Sakshi go out with him for coffee, and Sonali rubbed his leg. The customer put his hand up Sonali's skirt under the table, so she brought her hand up and stabbed it with a fork, leading to her arrest. Vivek decides to give Sonali a chance, and they begin to get along. With Sakshi's encouragement, Vivek and Sonali fall in love. Later on, when Anthony proposes to Sakshi, Sonali is displeased. One day after Anthony's concert, his fans greet him. Some kiss him and even give him their phone number. Sonali tries to convince Sakshi that Anthony is also a flirt, but Sakshi dismisses her. Sonali texts him flirtatiously to prove it. He refuses at first but eventually agrees to meet her. Sakshi reassured Sonali that he does not have bad intentions, but Sonali went to meet him anyway, with Sakshi secretly observing them. She sees them drink and get intimate in the farmhouse. However, Anthony suddenly kills Sonali. Richard arrives at the scene and helps Anthony clean up the scene. Sakshi left unnoticed and told Vivek what happened. They went to the police station, where she recognized Richard. Anthony brought Sakshi to Richard again to report Sonali's disappearance, where she saw a poster for a girl who gave Anthony her number. Sakshi discovered that the dates of the disappearances coincide with Anthony's concerts. She planned to take revenge with Vivek by deceiving Anthony to go to the villa so Vivek can kill him. After Anthony is knocked out and restrained, they interrogate him after he wakes up.

Anthony reveals that he killed his wife and her lover at a motel for their unfaithfulness. Richard entered the room and decided to let him continue. When he went to meet Richard outside, Richard reveals he had come to the same motel to investigate his wife, who was also cheating on him in another room. Anthony then proceeded to kill Richard's wife, and Richard helps cover up the murders. Subsequently, Anthony begins killing all unfaithful women who hit on him, and Richard hides all the bodies and evidence. Upon hearing this, Sakshi kills Anthony in rage.

In the present, Sakshi and Vivek decide to expose Richard to the FBI using the footage. However, Richard kidnaps Vivek and holds him hostage. Maha, who put a tracker on Richard's car earlier, kills Richard and saves them. Afterwards, Richard and Anthony's crimes are finally proven, and Anthony's murder officially remains unsolved. The film ends with Sakshi and Vivek paying respects to Sonali at her grave.

Cast 
R. Madhavan as Anthony Gonsalves 
Michael Madsen as Richard Dawkins
Anushka Shetty as Sakshi
Anjali as Mahalakshmi "Maha"
Shalini Pandey as Sonali
Subbaraju as Vivek
Srinivas Avasarala as Purna Chandra Rao (Surya Kandasamy in Tamil)

Production 
In 2013, director Hemant Madhukar re-watched Singeetam Srinivasa Rao's dialogue-less film Pushpaka Vimana (1987) and developed a desire to make a similar dialogue-less film. He was keen to explore the idea with a hearing and speech impaired protagonist. Once he wrote the story that would become Nishabdham, he pitched it to the PVP Group for production, but there was no progress for months despite PVP liking the idea. Madhukar then discussed the project with screenwriter Kona Venkat, who helped improvise the script and develop the screenplay. Venkat felt it had potential to be an "international project", and included dialogues.

R. Madhavan and Taapsee Pannu were signed on to play the lead roles, though the actress later opted out citing a scheduling conflict. While on a flight, Venkat had a chance meeting with Anushka Shetty, narrated the script to her, and she joined the project. Anjali was cast as an American police officer, while American actor Michael Madsen was cast in an important role. Shalini Pandey, Subbaraju, and Srinivas Avasarala were cast in supporting roles.

Principal photography began in May 2019. The filming took place predominantly in the United States, with a 60-day long schedule. The film was predominately shot in Telugu while a few scenes were reshot in Tamil. The international actors spoke their lines in English.

Release 
The film was scheduled to be released on 21 February 2020 but was postponed to 2 April 2020. Due to the COVID-19 pandemic the film's release was postponed indefinitely. The official trailer was launched by Amazon Prime Video on 21 September 2020.

The film was released through Prime Video on 2 October 2020 in Telugu and Tamil languages, along with dubbed versions in Malayalam and Kannada.

Reception 
Regarding the Telugu version, The Times of India gave the film three out of five stars and stated, "Nishabdham on the whole promises to be a treat, not just to Anushka’s fans but to movie buffs who love thrillers too. Sadly, it doesn’t always live up to that promise because all it ends up being is a stylish film with no depth". Regarding the Tamil version, The Times of India gave the film a rating of two out of five stars and noted that "Silence is meant to be a whodunit, but the moment you get the plot points, the film stops being one" and additionally stated that "the Tamil version resembles a dubbed film".

Karthik Kumar of Hindustan Times called Nishabdham "a colossal mess", and added, "Despite the presence of some talented stars like Anushka and Madhavan, the film is excruciatingly boring and lacks the thrills to keep one invested throughout." Sowmya Rajendran writing for The News Minute, opined that "The ideas must have sounded good on paper but the writing and execution, unfortunately, don't hold up." While appreciating the performances of Shetty and Pandey, Sowmya wrote "Michael Madsen as police chief Richard Dickens deserved more to his character. With a limp and a swagger, he does his best with what he's given."

Soundtrack 
The soundtrack was composed by Gopi Sundar, whereas the lyrics for the Telugu version are written by Bhaskarabhatla, Sreejo, Krishna Kanth, and Ramajogayya Sastry. The song "Ninne Ninne" in Telugu and "Neeye Neeye" in Tamil was released as single from the album on 17 December 2019. "Madhuramithe" in Telugu and "Pudhu Unarve" in Tamil were released on 29 September 2020.

References

External links 

2020 direct-to-video films
2020 thriller films
2020 multilingual films
2020s Tamil-language films
2020s Telugu-language films
Amazon Prime Video original films
Films about deaf people
Films about disability in India
Films not released in theaters due to the COVID-19 pandemic
Films postponed due to the COVID-19 pandemic
Films shot in Seattle
Indian haunted house films
Indian multilingual films
Indian thriller films
Films directed by Hemant Madhukar